Steven Beattie (born 8 August 1988) is an Irish footballer who most recently played for League of Ireland First Division club Cork City.

Career

Initial career stumbles in North America and move to Iceland
Beattie was a three-time All American at Northern Kentucky University and was drafted by in the first round of the 2011 MLS Supplemental Draft by Toronto FC, however he was never signed by the team. He signed with the Puerto Rico Islanders of the NASL, but was injured in his first game. To get his career back on track he signed with second division Icelandic club Tindastóll. In his first half-season with the club, Beattie scored 4 goals in 10 appearances. In his second and only full season with Tindastóll he made 21 appearances in the league, while making 2 Super Cup appearances, he scored 7 total goals.

Initial successes in Ireland
After his second season with the club he moved to the League of Ireland, playing with three clubs between 2014 and 2019, most prominently with Cork City. After impressing in Iceland, Beattie moved to Dublin side Bohemian F.C. where he made 29 appearances and scored 4 goals, with 5 Cup appearances, in his only season with the club. After a season in Dublin Beattie moved to Sligo Rovers F.C. Beattie only spent half of a season in Sligo however, scoring 2 goals, before moving to Cork City. During his time in Cork, Beattie played in over 100 games and scored over 10 goals. While in Cork, Beattie's trophy cabinet grew, with the club winning one League of Ireland title, two FAI Cup titles, three President's Cup titles, and two Munster Senior League titles.

USL League One and Chattanooga
Most recently he moved to U.S. based club Chattanooga Red Wolves to play in the newly created USL League One, the third-division of American Soccer. Before the season began, Beattie was named the team's captain. On 30 March 2019 Beattie scored the first goal in Red Wolves history from nearly 30 yards out in the 83rd minute of a 3–2 loss to North Texas SC. In addition to the first goal in Red Wolves' history, Beattie was also named to the first ever USL League One team of the week on 2 April 2019. On April 23, 2019, Beattie was named the Player of the Week for Week 4 of the 2019 campaign. Throughout the Red Wolves' campaign, Beattie was considered one of the bright spots of both the team and the league, however, despite this, it was not enough for the Red Wolves to make the league playoffs with the team finishing in 5th place, one spot out. On October 16, 2019 Beattie was named to the USL League One All League First Team as one of the best players of the season.

Return to Cork City 
On 11 January 2021 Cork City announced that Beattie was returning to the club. Beattie noted that he "always wanted to return to the club at some stage" and was ready to "try and get the club back to where it belongs." Beattie re-debuted for the club in 1–0 loss to Cabinteely. On 2 December 2021, it was announced that Beattie would be leaving the club.

Career statistics

Honours
Cork City
League of Ireland Premier Division: 2017
FAI Cup: 2016, 2017
President of Ireland's Cup: 2016, 2017, 2018
Munster Senior Cup: 2016–17, 2017–18

References

External links 

1988 births
Living people
Sportspeople from Fingal
Republic of Ireland association footballers
Republic of Ireland expatriate association footballers
Puerto Rico Islanders players
Steven Beattie
1. deild karla players
Bohemian F.C. players
Sligo Rovers F.C. players
Cork City F.C. players
League of Ireland players
Chattanooga Red Wolves SC players
USL League One players
Association football midfielders
Irish expatriate sportspeople in Iceland
Irish expatriate sportspeople in the United States
Toronto FC draft picks
Expatriate footballers in Iceland
Expatriate soccer players in the United States
Northern Kentucky Norse men's soccer players
North American Soccer League players
People from Skerries, Dublin